Edward John Dawson (October 10, 1907 – October 24, 1998) was a Canadian basketball player who competed in the 1936 Summer Olympics.

Dawson was part of the Canadian basketball team, which won the silver medal. He played three matches.

References

External links
profile

1907 births
1998 deaths
Basketball players at the 1936 Summer Olympics
Basketball position missing
Canadian men's basketball players
Canadian people of Scottish descent
Medalists at the 1936 Summer Olympics
Olympic basketball players of Canada
Olympic medalists in basketball
Olympic silver medalists for Canada
Basketball players from Windsor, Ontario
20th-century Canadian people